The Hennion was a two seat French training and touring aircraft, completed just before World War II began. It was flown again post-war and later fitted with a new engine; it survived into the early 1960s.

Design and development

Emile Hennion was the chief pilot at the Casablanca Aero Club in the 1930s. Just before the outbreak of World War II he designed, built and flew a side-by-side seat two seat aircraft, powered by a Train 4A 01 inverted four cylinder air-cooled engine which produced only . His goals were safety in the hands of a beginner, economy, comfort and true touring ability. The first two features made it of some interest as an ab initio trainer after France had gone to war.

In this pre-war form it was known as the Hennion 01. It was a low wing, cantilever monoplane, its wings straight tapered with blunt tips and of quite high aspect ratio (10). The wings were built around a single spar and fabric covered, though the ailerons were plywood skinned.

The fuselage was flat sided and ply skinned, except behind the cockpit where rounded, raised decking was fabric covered. The Hennion's cockpit was fully enclosed under a two piece canopy with a sliding rear component. Its two seats were equipped with dual controls. The inverted Train engine in the nose drove a two blade propeller and its fuel tank held . At the rear the vertical tail was tall, with an unbalanced rudder which reached down to the keel and a fuselage mounted tailplane ahead of it.
The Hennion 01 flew for the first time on 28 September 1939 at Casablanca.

The Hennion 01 survived the war and was flown again in 1949, now on the French civil register as F-WFOY. After a period of disuse, it was re-engined in 1956 with a  Continental A65 air-cooled flat-four in a revised nose and redesignated the Hennion II. The extra power gave a useful increase in speed despite an increase in empty weight of about 17%. On 4 February 1962 it was destroyed at Meknes.

Variants
Hennion 01 pre-war version with Train engine
Hennion II 1956 revision with a more powerful Continental engine

Specifications (Hennion II)

References

1930s French sport aircraft
Low-wing aircraft
Single-engined tractor aircraft
Aircraft first flown in 1939